Peter Gommeren (born 9 March 1992) is a Dutch footballer who plays as a defensive midfielder for Tweede Klasse club SC Kruisland.

Career
On 17 March 2013, Gommeren made his professional debut for NAC Breda in a 4–0 Eredivisie win over Willem II, coming on as a substitute for Jordy Buijs shortly before full time. Gommeren mostly played for the reserve team, Jong NAC, and trialled with Eerste Divisie club FC Dordrecht and Achilles '29 in 2013.

In 2014, Gommeren began playing for Belgian Eerste Provinciaale club Houtvenne. He returned to the Netherlands after one season, joining Leonidas. In 2018, he moved to SC Kruisland competing in the Tweede Klasse.

References

External links
 

1992 births
Living people
Dutch footballers
Dutch expatriate footballers
Association football midfielders
Eredivisie players
Derde Divisie players
NAC Breda players
KFC Houtvenne players
RKSV Leonidas players
Footballers from Breda
Expatriate footballers in Belgium
Dutch expatriate sportspeople in Belgium